Thiripurasundari Srinivasan (21 March 1921 – 7 January 1987), better known by her pen name Lakshmi, was an Indian writer from Tamil Nadu.

Biography
Thiripurasundari was born in Thottiyam in ,Tamil Nadu. Her parents were Dr. Srinivasan and Pattammal (Sivakami). She was schooled at Thottiyam, Musiri and Holy Cross School, Trichy. She studied in Stanley Medical College and became a medical doctor. She began publishing short stories in Ananda Vikatan while still at college. She used "Lakshmi" as her pen name. Her first short story to be published was Thagunda thandanaya? (lit. An apt punishment?). Her first novel to be published was Bhavani. After completing her medical education, she practiced at Chennai. She married Kannabiran in 1955 and moved to South Africa, where she lived for the next twenty two years. Her husband died in 1966. She returned to India in 1977 and took up full-time writing. She died in 1987.

Thiripurasundari was a prolific writer who has published hundreds of short stories and novels. Her novels Penn manam and Mithila Vilas were awarded the Tamil Valarchi Kazhagam price. In 1984, she was awarded the Sahitya Akademi Award for Tamil for her novel Oru Kaveriyai pola(lit. Like the river Kaveri). Her Kanchanaiyin Kanavu and Penn Manam and sooryakandham, one of her best works were made into Tamil films - Kanchana(1952) and Iruvar Ullam (1963). Most of her works were based on family issues.

In 2009, when the Government of Tamil Nadu offered to nationalise her works, her legal heirs refused the offer.

Partial bibliography

Azhagin Aradhanai
Aval Thayagiral
Asoka maram pookavillai
Adutha Veedu
Arakku Maaligai
Adhisiya Raagam
Aththai
Avalukkendru oru idam
Aval oru Thendral
Irandavadu malar
Ivala en magal
Irandu pengal
Irandavadu thenilavu
Iniya unarvae ennai kolladhae
Irulil tholaindha unmai
Indrum naalayum
Ivanum oru parasuraman
Uravugal pirivathillai
Uyarvu
Uravin kural
Uyire odivaa
Ooonrukol
En veedu
En manaivi
Oru Kaveriyai pola
Oru Sivappu pachayagiradhu
Kadaisi varai
Gangaiyum Vandhal
Kadhavu Thirandaal
Kadhasiriyaiyin kadhai
Kazhuthil vizhundha maalai
Kanavan amaivedhallam
Kashmi kathi
Kaaliyin kangal
Kooramal sanniyasam
Koondukullae oru pachchai kili
Kai maariya podhu
Kodai megangal
Sasiyin kadidhangal
Thirumbi paarthal
Thunai
Thai pirakattum
Thottathu veedu
Nadhi moolam
Nalladhor veenai
Nayakkar magal
Nirka Neramillai
Nyayangal marumpodhu
Nigazhdha kadhaigal
Neela pudavai
Needhikku kaigal neelam
Pannayar magal
Pavalamalli
Bhavani
Punidha oru pudhir
Pudhai manal
Peyar solla maatten
Penn manam
Pennin parisu
Maragadham
Manam oru ranga rattinam
Mann kudhirai
Mannum pennum
Maru magal
Marupadiyuma?
Mayamaan
Meendum vasandham
Meendum oru seethai
Meendum pirandhaalin
Meendum penn manam
Mithilaa vilaas
Mohini vanthaal
Murugan sirithaan
Mogathirai
Radhaavin thirumanam
Rama Rajyam
Roja vairam
Vanitha
Vasanthikku vandha aasai
Vadakke oru sandhippu
Vaazha ninaithaal
Veerathevan kottai
Velicham vandhadhu
Jeyanthi Vandhaal
Srimathi maithili
Vellai nirathiloru poonai
My name is T.G.Karthik

Awards and recognitions
Tamil Valarchi Kazhagam award for Penn manam and Mithila Vilas
Sahitya Akademi Award for Tamil in 1984

References

External links
Lakshmi Profile at Koottanchoru blog

1921 births
1987 deaths
Women writers from Tamil Nadu
Recipients of the Sahitya Akademi Award in Tamil
Tamil writers
Indian Tamil people
20th-century Indian women writers
20th-century Indian dramatists and playwrights
20th-century Indian short story writers
20th-century Indian novelists
Indian women short story writers
Indian women novelists
Screenwriters from Tamil Nadu
Tamil-language writers
20th-century Indian screenwriters